The Transitional Program, originally titled The Death Agony of Capitalism and the Tasks of the Fourth International and later reprinted under the title, The Transitional Program and the Struggle for Socialism, is a  political platform adopted by the 1938 founding congress of the Fourth International, the international Leninist organization founded by Leon Trotsky.  It is an example of a transitional programme.

Intent 
The "transitional" idea of this program, roughly, is the following. The working class is not acquainted with the necessity of embracing the revolutionary ideas of the Fourth International due to "the confusion and disappointment of the older generation,  the inexperience of the younger generation". Hence

The problem lay in the fact that the "epoch of progressive capitalism" had ended in the prior period. This meant that "every serious demand of the proletariat" reached beyond the limits of what the capitalist and the bourgeois state were prepared to willingly give.

The old "minimum" demands had been raised by reformists on the understanding that they were acceptable to an expanding capitalism, and had been dropped when they were not. The Fourth International, Trotsky writes, does not discard the program of the old “minimal” demands "to the degree to which these have preserved at least part of their vital forcefulness." Trotskyists should indefatigably defend "the democratic rights and social conquests of the workers".
 
But in addition, transitional demands include the call for "employment and decent living conditions for all"  and reach beyond what the capitalists will willingly give, challenging the "very basis of the bourgeois regime." Demands such as higher wages are not impossible demands in themselves, Trotsky argues, but capitalism in crisis demands lower wages in the hope of increasing profitability. Transitional demands therefore do not draw back in the face of the contingencies of capitalist economics, but on the contrary, it is proposed, they continually challenge the logic of the capitalist system, expose it in the eyes of the workers, and thus help them draw towards a fully rounded out socialist consciousness - an acceptance and adoption of the "maximum programme" which the socialist leaders kept for their holiday speechifying, as an immediate and realistic necessity.

By fighting for these "transitional" demands, in the opinion of the Trotskyists, the workers will come to realize that capitalism cannot meet their needs, and they will then embrace the full program of the Fourth International.

Proposals 

In the face of high unemployment and high prices (meaning, in particular, inflation) the Transitional Programme raises slogans such as a "sliding scale of wages". This means demanding a contract with the employers which ensures that if prices go up then wages (or salaries) go up by the same extent, i.e. that wages are permanently "inflation proofed". This demand was won by the Italian workers in 1945-46 (the scala mobile), who fought to keep it until it was given up in the early 1990s.

Alongside "public works" - meaning a programme of creating public amenities (health care, housing, education etc.) - a reduction in hours is also proposed for those in work, without loss of pay, so that unemployment will be reduced as more workers will have to be taken on to maintain production:

This demand also has its historical precedents. For instance, in the period of "new unionism" in UK working class history in 1889, and despite the often desperate conditions of working-class people of the time, Will Thorne, leader of the gas workers in the East End of London, and one time follower of Marxist ideas, won a reduction of hours from 12 hours to 8 hours, on the basis of a successful vote to strike and mass meetings preparatory to the strike. The owners of the gas industry had to move from a two shift system to a three shift system, no doubt at great expense, and the increase in employment of thousands of men was a part of the motivation for Thorne's stubborn insistence in striking for a reduction of hours without loss of pay, rather than wages.

Trotsky urges that transitional demands should include the call for the expropriation of various groups of capitalists - sometimes translated in modern terms into the nationalisation of various sectors - under the control and management of the workers. Transitional demands should include opposition to imperialist war. Such demands intend to challenge the capitalist class's right to rule.

Authorship 
The program was formally proposed to the Congress by the National Committee of the Socialist Workers Party (US). The program was developed through discussions between Leon Trotsky, who did much of the drafting of the document, and leaders of the SWP such as James P. Cannon. Those involved were at pains to ensure that the Program was seen as a document of the FI. However, Trotskyist currents that have departed the Fourth International tend to present the Program as a work authored by Trotsky individually.

Published editions

See also 
 Crisis of Leadership

Notes

Citations

References

External links 
The Death Agony of Capitalism and the Tasks of the Fourth International

1938 documents
Party platforms
Trotskyism